Ethyl dirazepate is a drug which is a benzodiazepine derivative which was developed by Sanofi Winthrop. It has anxiolytic and hypnotic and possibly other characteristic benzodiazepine properties.

See also
Benzodiazepine

References

Benzodiazepines
Chloroarenes
Lactams
Ethyl esters
GABAA receptor positive allosteric modulators